The Roanoke Metropolitan Statistical Area is a Metropolitan Statistical Area (MSA) in Virginia as defined by the United States Office of Management and Budget (OMB). The Roanoke MSA is sometimes referred to as the Roanoke Valley, even though the Roanoke MSA occupies a larger area than the Roanoke Valley. It is geographically similar to the area known as the Roanoke Region of Virginia, but while the latter includes Alleghany County, the former does not. As of the 2020 census, the MSA had a population of 315,251.

Figures through 2000 do not include Franklin County (50,345 est. 2005 population) and Craig County (5,154 est. 2005 population). The Census Bureau has since added them to the Roanoke MSA, which is the fourth largest in Virginia (behind Northern Virginia, Hampton Roads, and the Greater Richmond area), and the largest in the western half of the state. Its current rank is 201 among all 363 MSAs. The Roanoke, VA MSA population changed from 288,307 in 2000 to 315,251 in 2020, a greater than 9.34 percent change.

MSA components
Note: Since a state constitutional change in 1871, all cities in Virginia are independent cities that are not located in any county. The OMB considers these independent cities to be county-equivalents for the purpose of defining MSAs in Virginia.

Four counties and two independent cities are included in the Roanoke Metropolitan Statistical Area.

Counties
Botetourt
Craig 
Franklin 
Roanoke
Independent Cities
Roanoke
Salem

Politics

Communities

Places with more than 100,000 inhabitants
Roanoke (Principal city)

Places with 10,000 to 30,000 inhabitants
Cave Spring (census-designated place)
Hollins (census-designated place)
Salem

Places with 1,000 to 10,000 inhabitants
Blue Ridge (census-designated place)
Buchanan
Cloverdale (census-designated place)
Daleville (census-designated place)
Ferrum (census-designated place)
Henry Fork (census-designated place)
Laymantown (census-designated place)
North Shore (census-designated place)
Rocky Mount
Union Hall (census-designated place)
Vinton
Westlake Corner (census-designated place)

Places with less than 1,000 inhabitants
Boones Mill
Fincastle
Glenvar (census-designated place)
New Castle
Penhook (census-designated place)
Troutville

Unincorporated places

Demographics
As of the census of 2000, there were 288,309 people, 119,366 households, and 80,009 families residing within the MSA. The racial makeup of the MSA was 84.96% White, 12.21% African American, 0.17% Native American, 1.05% Asian, 0.02% Pacific Islander, 0.47% from other races, and 1.12% from two or more races. Hispanic or Latino of any race were 1.13% of the population.

The median income for a household in the MSA was $40,251, and the median income for a family was $47,248. Males had a median income of $32,294 versus $23,427 for females. The per capita income for the MSA was $20,390.

See also
List of U.S. Metropolitan Statistical Areas in Virginia
Virginia census statistical areas

References

 
Botetourt County, Virginia
Craig County, Virginia
Franklin County, Virginia
Roanoke County, Virginia
Roanoke, Virginia
Salem, Virginia
Southwest Virginia
Western Virginia